Saudatu Usman Bungudu (born 15 January 1942 in Bungudu, Zamfara state Nigeria) was appointed Nigeria's Women Affairs and Social Development minister in July 2007. She was relieved of her post on 29 October 2008 in a cabinet reshuffle.

She graduated from Uthman dan Fodiyo University before first becoming commissioner of Women and Children Affairs in Zamfara State and later federal minister. During her tenure as a minister of Nigeria's Women Affairs and social Development ministry, she decried the judgement passed by an upper area court in Lafia, Nassarawa state in the case of the rape of a nine-month-old baby.

See also
Nigerian Ministry of Women Affairs

References

Women affairs and social development ministers of Nigeria
Commissioners of state ministries in Nigeria
1942 births
Living people
Nigerian Muslims
People from Zamfara State
Women's ministers
21st-century Nigerian politicians
21st-century Nigerian women politicians
Women government ministers of Nigeria